Archery is an album by John Zorn featuring his early "game piece" composition of the same name. The album was released by Parachute Records in 1982.

Reception
The AllMusic review by Thom Jurek gave the album four stars, stating: "The package, as with all Tzadik releases, is stellar, full of three inserts, production notes, and a replica of the original score. If you allow it to, it will change the way you listen to music—and maybe watch TV, too."

Track listing

Personnel 
 John Zorn – alto and soprano saxophone, B♭ clarinet, game calls, E♭ clarinet
 Robert Dick – flute, bass flute, piccolo, game calls
 George Lewis – trombone
 Anthony Coleman – keyboards
 Wayne Horvitz – keyboards, harmonica, tape, electronics 
 Mark Kramer – keyboards
 Eugene Chadbourne – guitar, Dobro 
 Bill Horvitz – guitar 
 Bill Laswell – bass guitar
 Polly Bradfield – violin 
 Tom Cora – cello
 David Moss – drums, voice, hammered dulcimer, zither

References 

John Zorn albums
Tzadik Records albums
1982 albums